This is the discography of Steven Van Zandt (also known as "Little Steven" or "Miami Steve"), an American songwriter, singer and musician. Van Zandt has been featured on records steadily since 1975 as a member of Bruce Springsteen's The E Street Band and Southside Johnny and the Asbury Jukes, as well as with his own band Little Steven and the Disciples of Soul.

Albums

Studio albums

Live albums

Soundtrack albums

Compilation albums

Box sets

Extended plays

Singles

Promotional Singles/Other Charted Songs

As Featured Artist

Note: The single "Way Down (I Won't Cry No More)" featuring Van Zandt from Dion's Blues with Friends didn't chart (2020)

Videography

Video albums

Music videos

Band member / guest appearances 

 Bruce Springsteen
 Born to Run (1975)
 Darkness on the Edge of Town (1978)
 The River (1980)
 Born in the U.S.A. (1984)
 Live/1975-85 (1986)
 Greatest Hits (1995)
 Blood Brothers (1996)
 Tracks (1998)
 18 Tracks (1999)
 Live in New York City (2001)
 The Rising (2002)
 The Essential Bruce Springsteen (2003)
 Hammersmith Odeon London '75 (2006)
 Magic (2007)
 Magic Tour Highlights (2008)
 Working on a Dream (2009)
 The Promise (2010)
 Wrecking Ball (2012)
 High Hopes (2014)
Letter to You (2020)
 Southside Johnny & The Asbury Jukes
 I Don't Want To Go Home (1976)
 Live at the Bottom Line (1976)
 This Time It's for Real (1977)
 Hearts of Stone (1978)
 Havin' a Party (1979)
 Better Days (1991)
 Jukebox (2007)
 Ronnie Spector & The E Street Band
 "Say Goodbye to Hollywood" / "Baby Please Don't Go" (1977)
 Gary U.S. Bonds
  Dedication (1981)
  On the Line (1982)
  Standing in the Line of Fire (1984)
 Artists United Against Apartheid
 Sun City (1985)
 Iron City Houserockers
 Have a Good Time But Get Out Alive! (1980)
 Meat Loaf
 Welcome to the Neighborhood (1995)
 Jimmy Barnes
 For The Working Class Man  (1985)
 Davie Allan & The Arrows
 Fuzz for the Holidays (2004)
 Darlene Love
 "All Alone on Christmas" (1992)
 Introducing Darlene Love (2015)
Demolition 23.
Demolition 23. (1994)

References

External links
 www.LittleSteven.com

Discography
Discographies of American artists